Croydon West was a borough constituency represented in the House of Commons of the Parliament of the United Kingdom from 1950 to 1955. It elected one Member of Parliament (MP) by the first past the post system of election.

Politics and history 

Croydon West was a short-lived seat for the 1950 general election, creating three seats in the County Borough of Croydon from the previous two, also taking in areas from the East Surrey constituency to the south.

Croydon West took in areas of the former Croydon North and Croydon South constituencies, and East Surrey. It bordered Croydon East, Croydon North, East Surrey and Mitcham.

All three Croydon constituencies were abolished five years later at the 1955 general election, re-creating Croydon South and creating Croydon North East and Croydon North West seats.

For all of its history, Croydon West's Member of Parliament was Conservative Richard Thompson. It was contested in two elections: the 1950 general election and the 1951 general election. Prior to 1950, Croydon South had been held by Labour and most of the Labour voters were re-drawn into Croydon West, making it a marginal seat.

Boundaries 
The County Borough of Croydon wards of Broad Green, Central, South, Waddon, and Whitehorse Manor.

Members of Parliament 
1950 — 1955: Richard Thompson, Conservative

Election results

References

Notes

Politics of the London Borough of Croydon
Parliamentary constituencies in London (historic)
Constituencies of the Parliament of the United Kingdom established in 1950
Constituencies of the Parliament of the United Kingdom disestablished in 1955